Auguste Perrin (born 24 August 1894) was a French cross-country skier. He competed in the men's 50 kilometre event at the 1924 Winter Olympics.

References

External links
 

1894 births
Year of death missing
French male cross-country skiers
Olympic cross-country skiers of France
Cross-country skiers at the 1924 Winter Olympics
Sportspeople from Vosges (department)
20th-century French people